Kiribati and the United States have diplomatic relations.

History

Before independence

After independence 
Following its independence in 1979, Kiribati signed a treaty of friendship with the United States. The United States Department of State characterizes U.S.–Kiribati relations as "excellent", . Diplomatic relations are conducted by the I-Kiribati Ambassador to the United States. The United States has no consular or diplomatic facilities in the country. Officers of the American Embassy in Suva, Fiji, are concurrently accredited to Kiribati and make periodic visits. The U.S. Peace Corps, an independent United States federal agency, had maintained a program in Kiribati since 1967. However, the Corps announced plans to pull out of Kiribati in November 2008 after 35 years of working in the country. Michael Koffman, the Peace Corps Country Director for Kiribati, cited the frequently cancelled and erratic air service in the country as the main reason the Peace Corps was leaving Kiribati.

Embassy

United States 
Principal U.S. Embassy Officials include:
 US Ambassador – Tony Greubel

The U.S. Embassy responsible for Kiribati is located in Suva, Republic of the Fiji Islands.

Kiribati 
Principal Kiribati Officials include

 Permanent Representative of Kiribati to the United Nations - Teburoro Tito

The Kiribati Permanent Mission to the UN serves as the Embassy in the US.

See also 
 Foreign relations of the United States
 Foreign relations of Kiribati
 List of ambassadors of Kiribati to the United States

Further reading

References

External links 
 History of Kiribati - U.S. relations

 
Bilateral relations of the United States
United States